Pape Alassane Gueye (born 24 January 1999) is a Senegalese professional footballer who plays as a defensive midfielder for La Liga club Sevilla, on loan from Ligue 1 club Marseille. Born in France, he plays for the Senegal national team.

Club career

Le Havre
Gueye made his professional debut for Le Havre in a 0–0 Ligue 2 tie with Chamois Niortais on 5 May 2017. He signed his first professional contract on 20 June 2017.

Watford
On 29 April 2020, it was revealed that Gueye had agreed to join Premier League team Watford when his contract with Le Havre expired on 1 July 2020. Gueye signed a five-year contract with Watford and wore the club's jersey, according to promotional material and a press release made by the club. Twenty-four hours later, Watford agreed a deal for Gueye's transfer to Ligue 1 club Marseille, which included a sell-on clause for Watford. Gueye claimed his agent had given “bad advice”, citing his Watford contract contained a salary of £45,000 per month, not the £45,000 per week, that Gueye was originally quoted by his agent.

Marseille
On 1 July 2020, Gueye signed a four year deal with Ligue 1 side Marseille, for a reported fee of €3 million (£2.7 million).

Loan to Sevilla
On 30 January 2023, Gueye was loaned out to La Liga club Sevilla for the remainder of the season.

International career
Gueye was born in France and is of Senegalese descent. He represented both the France national under-18 football team and the France U19s. However, he decided to represent Senegal on senior level. He debuted with the Senegal national team in a 2–0 2022 FIFA World Cup qualification win over Congo on 14 November 2021.

Style of play
Gueye is a box-to-box midfielder, noted for his aggressive and highly competitive style of play. He also has a good game viewing and physical strength.

Career statistics

Club

Honours
Senegal
Africa Cup of Nations: 2021

References

External links
 
 
 Pape Gueye at the French Football Federation (in French)
 HAC Foot Profile

1999 births
Living people
Citizens of Senegal through descent
Sportspeople from Montreuil, Seine-Saint-Denis
French sportspeople of Senegalese descent
Black French sportspeople
Senegalese footballers
French footballers
Footballers from Seine-Saint-Denis
Association football midfielders
Senegal international footballers
France youth international footballers
Le Havre AC players
Watford F.C. players
Olympique de Marseille players
Sevilla FC players
Ligue 1 players
Ligue 2 players
Championnat National 2 players
La Liga players
Senegalese expatriate footballers
French expatriate footballers
Senegalese expatriate sportspeople in Spain
French expatriate sportspeople in Spain
Expatriate footballers in Spain
2021 Africa Cup of Nations players
2022 FIFA World Cup players
Africa Cup of Nations-winning players